Star Wars: The New Droid Army is a video game for the Game Boy Advance featuring Anakin Skywalker prior to his fall to the dark side and transformation into Darth Vader in Revenge of the Sith.

Plot 
In the game, Anakin Skywalker is sent to investigate rumors of the Separatists making a new type of droid, superior to other droids and invulnerable to lightsabers. Anakin travels to Tatooine but is hunted down by Aurra Sing and eventually held in the captivity of Jabba the Hutt. Anakin breaks out and is called to Coruscant. There, Anakin chases and defeats a Dark Jedi named Trenox and uncovers Count Dooku's plot to destroy the Jedi Archives. Anakin stops him, but Dooku escapes. Anakin is next sent to Metalorn, where he is to destroy the Cortosis Droid Factory and capture Wat Tambor, the leader of the Techno Union. Anakin completes both objectives but has to face Count Dooku while leaving the factory. Anakin defeats Dooku and moves on.

The plot is an alternative argument for Revenge of the Sith, where Anakin defeats Dooku and ends up as a Jedi hero, saying the following words to Yoda: "I Will Always be here to serve the Jedi, Master Yoda, I Give you my word ... "

Gameplay 
The game is presented in an isometric look, to give the feel of a unique 3-D view. There are numerous droids and aliens to fight, which makes for plenty of opportunities to use Anakin's lightsaber to attack or reflect incoming blaster shots. After passing each successive area, new force powers are earned that can aid Anakin later on. There are five such force powers in all, including the dash, jump, and push skills seen in the movies, as well as two others: the ability to heal faster and the ability to remain invisible for extended periods. Just as stamina decreases when Anakin is attacked, his force power also diminishes after every use. Since there are no health or force items to collect, the only ways to recover stamina and regain force power are to either stand still until both indicators are full again, or use the meditation power learned later in the game to recover faster. NPC's are mainly civilians, though there are some exceptions. Clone Troopers make an appearance (more specifically seven of them, in the underbelly of Coruscant) and fight alongside you to help defeat the droids and mercenaries. They don't move, and they can be killed. The only other instance of an NPC dying in this game is civilian workers on Metalorn falling into vats of molten metal.

Reception

The game was met with mixed reception upon release; GameRankings gave it a score of 58.92%, while Metacritic gave it 60 out of 100.

References

External links 

New Droid Army
Game Boy Advance games
Game Boy Advance-only games
2002 video games
THQ games
LucasArts games
Video games developed in the United States